Freddy Valera is a Venezuelan karateka. At the 2019 Pan American Games held in Lima, Peru, he won one of the bronze medals in the men's kumite 84 kg event.

At the 2018 Pan American Karate Championships, he won one of the bronze medals in the men's kumite 84 kg event.

In June 2021, he competed at the World Olympic Qualification Tournament held in Paris, France hoping to qualify for the 2020 Summer Olympics in Tokyo, Japan. In November 2021, he competed in the men's 84 kg event at the World Karate Championships held in Dubai, United Arab Emirates.

He won one of the bronze medals in his event at the 2022 South American Games held in Asunción, Paraguay.

References 

Living people
Year of birth missing (living people)
Place of birth missing (living people)
Venezuelan male karateka
Pan American Games medalists in karate
Pan American Games bronze medalists for Venezuela
Medalists at the 2019 Pan American Games
Karateka at the 2019 Pan American Games
Competitors at the 2018 Central American and Caribbean Games
Central American and Caribbean Games silver medalists for Venezuela
Central American and Caribbean Games medalists in karate
South American Games bronze medalists for Venezuela
South American Games medalists in karate
Competitors at the 2022 South American Games
21st-century Venezuelan people